This is a list of female sculptors – women notable for their three-dimensional artistic work (including sound and light). Do not add entries for those without a Wikipedia article.

A

B

C

D

E

F

G

H

I
Yiota Ioannidou (born 1971), Cyprus
Pamela Irving (born 1960), Australia
Linde Ivimey (born 1965), Australia

J

K

L

M

N

O

P

R

S

T

U

V

W

Y

Z

See also

List of female architects
List of sculptors

References

+Female
Sculptors